Salm-Reifferscheid-Krautheim was a short-lived Imperial Estate to the Holy Roman Empire, which was created as a succession of  in 1803. It was raised to a Principality in 1804, and was mediatised to the Kingdom of Wurttemberg and the Grand Duchy of Baden in 1806.

History 
The statelet was created on 25 February 1803 as one of the results of the Reichsdeputationshauptschluss, in which the House of Salm-Reifferscheidt-Bedburg was compensated for the loss of its areas on the left bank of the Rhine by becoming a principality formed from Mainz and Würzburg possessions.

See also

References 

 
1803 establishments
1806 disestablishments